General elections were held in Islamabad Capital Territory on Wednesday, 24 October 1990 to elect 1 member of National Assembly of Pakistan from Islamabad.

Pakistan Muslim League (N) won Islamabad seat by the margin of 13,328 votes.

Candidates 
Total no of 13 Candidates including 7 Independents contested for 1 National Assembly Seat from Islamabad.

Result 

Party Wise

Constituency wise

References 

1990 elections in Pakistan
General elections in Pakistan